Lake No is a lake in South Sudan. It is located just north of the vast swamp of the Sudd, at the confluence of the Bahr al Jabal and Bahr el Ghazal rivers, and marks the transition between the Bahr al Jabal and White Nile proper.  Lake No is located approximately 1,156 km downstream of Uganda's Lake Albert, the major lake on the White Nile preceding Lake No.  The lake is considered the center of the Ruweng people of Panaruu section of Dinka peoples.

See also 
 East Africa
 Northeast Africa

References 

No
Nile